Stranvaesia is a genus of flowering plants in the family Rosaceae. Its morphology is so similar to Photinia that it has sometimes been included within that genus, but recent molecular data indicate that the two genera are not related.

Species
Stranvaesia amphidoxa (syn. Photinia amphidoxa)
Stranvaesia davidiana (syn. Photinia davidiana)
Stranvaesia nussia (syn. Photinia nussia)
Stranvaesia oblanceolata
Stranvaesia tomentosa (syn. Photinia tomentosa)

References

 
Rosaceae genera